is a TV station headquartered in Sapporo, Hokkaidō, Japan, and is affiliated with the TX Network.

Transmitters 
JOHI-TV has a total of 77 transmitters, including the following:

TVh did not possess analog transmitters at Kushiro, Obihiro and Abashimi, as those stations began broadcasting in the second half of 2011, after the conclusion of analog broadcasts.

Offices 
Headquarters - 6-12-4, Odori-higashi, Chūō-ku, Sapporo
Tokyo office - Hashizen Building, Shinbashi, Minato, Tokyo
Osaka office - Sakurabashi Yachio Building, 2-5-6, Umeda, Kita-ku, Osaka

External links 
テレビ北海道 , TV Hokkaido official website

Hokkaido
Television stations in Japan
TX Network
Television channels and stations established in 1989
Mass media in Sapporo
Nikkei Inc.